The M-1 (or M-59) was a standard issue gas mask for troops in Yugoslavia, as well as for SFRY successor states (Bosnia, Croatia, Macedonia, Montenegro, Slovenia, Serbia). This respirator was only available until 2005, therefore, the filters are said to have had a limited working lifetime assigned. It is a copy of the U.S. M-9 gas mask. It was also used by the Iraqi army in the Gulf War, where it was designated M-59. It is OD green in color, and has a side-loading canister which uses a 60mm opening. The M-1 is not very common in the United States, as few were imported as surplus. There are different versions of the mask, MC-1 (civilian version), M-1 (civilian version but with oral nasal cup, and some things in the bag are different) and the M-59 (the military version). The filter doesn't have asbestos, but may contain chromium.

References

Gas masks
Military equipment of Bosnia and Herzegovina
Military equipment of Croatia
Military of North Macedonia
Military equipment of Montenegro
Military equipment of Slovenia
Military equipment of Serbia
Military equipment of Yugoslavia